Korana Longin-Zanze (born 13 June 1973) is a Croatian female basketball player. She is 194 cm tall and weighs 90 kg. She is a veteran of the Croatian national team and has played for a variety of European clubs.

She was born in Zadar (then SFR Yugoslavia), and has played for the local clubs Elemes Šibenik (1988-1991), KK Split (1993-1994), KK Centar Banka Zagreb (1994-1996), Jolly JBS Šibenik (1996-1998). She spent the 1991-1993 period playing for Bari, Italy.

She went abroad to play for the Turkish club Galatasaray in the 1998-99 season. In the 2000-2001 season she was at Universitat de Barcelona/FC Barcelona Bàsquet in Spain. 

Longin-Zanze played for the Turkish club Fenerbahçe İstanbul between 2003 and 2006.

The South Korean club Kumholife Redwings hired her for the 2006 Summer league. In the 2006-2007 season, she played for the Italian club Levoni Taranto.
She then transferred to the Turkish side Beşiktaş Cola Turka as center position. She also played for Besiktas in the 2008-2009 season.

She was part of the Croatia women's national basketball team, with whom she played at the Mediterranean Games in Bari in 1997 and Tunis in 2001, and the European women's basketball championship in Poland in 1999. She retired from the national team in 2005.

References

1973 births
Living people
Basketball players from Zadar
Croatian women's basketball players
Yugoslav women's basketball players
Centers (basketball)
Croatian expatriate basketball people in Turkey
Croatian expatriate basketball people in Spain
Croatian expatriate sportspeople in Italy
Galatasaray S.K. (women's basketball) players
Beşiktaş women's basketball players
Fenerbahçe women's basketball players
Mediterranean Games gold medalists for Croatia
Mediterranean Games medalists in basketball
Competitors at the 1997 Mediterranean Games
Competitors at the 2001 Mediterranean Games